Led Zeppelin Boxed Set 2 is a double album released by Atlantic Records on 21 September 1993. This box set features the rest of the English rock band Led Zeppelin's catalogue not included in the 1990 4-CD box set Led Zeppelin, all digitally remastered, including the previously unreleased studio track "Baby Come On Home". A 54-page booklet was also included with the release. Between this box set and the 4-CD box set every track from the band's nine studio albums are featured along with two BBC live recordings; the band's only non-LP b-side; and one studio outtake.


Track listing

 "Black Mountain Side" is slightly edited removing the crossfade from "Your Time Is Gonna Come".

Sales chart performance

Sales certifications

Release history

Personnel
Led Zeppelin
John Bonham – drums, percussion
John Paul Jones – bass guitar, keyboards, mandolin
Jimmy Page – acoustic and electric guitars, production, remastering, digital remastering
Robert Plant – vocals, harmonica

Additional musicians
Viram Jasani – tabla on "Black Mountain Side"
Ian Stewart – piano on "Boogie with Stu"

Production
Bob Alford – photography
Rick Barrett - rare collectibles
Yves Beauvais – production
Bruce Buchanan – engineering
Richard Creamer – photography
Jim Cummins – photography
Chris Dreja – photography
Robert Ellis – photography
Larry Fremantle – design
Peter Grant – executive producer
Jeff Griffin – production
Bob Gruen – photography
Chris Houston – engineering
Richard "Hutch" Hutchison – design co-ordinator
Neil Jones – photography
John Kubick – digital transfers
Kurt Loder – liner notes
Janet Macoska – photography
John Mahoney – programming
George Marino – remastering and digital remastering
Jennifer Moore – photography and imaging
Terry O'Neil – photography
Barry Plummer – photography
Neal Preston – photography
Michael Putland – photography
Rhonda Schoen – digital editing and transfers
Peter Simon – photography
Pennie Smith – photography
Jay Thompson – photography
Chris Walter – photography
Tony Wilson – engineering
Chris Wroe – photography and imaging
Neil Zlozower – photography

References

Albums produced by Jimmy Page
Led Zeppelin compilation albums
1993 compilation albums
Atlantic Records compilation albums
Folk rock compilation albums